Edward Anthony "Eddie" Sotto III (born 1958) is an American experiential designer, mixed-media producer, and conceptualist. Sotto was formerly the Senior Vice President of Concept Design for Walt Disney Imagineering, and is currently president of the Los Angeles design firm SottoStudios Incorporated. He also established the think tank Futureproof Experiences in 2020 to address the challenges posed to the experiential industries by COVID-19. In 2002 Sotto was named one of the thousand most creative people in America in the book 1000: Richard Saul Wurman's Who's Really Who by TED founder Richard Saul Wurman. In 2018 he addressed the TEDxBermuda event with his presentation "The How of Wow". He was also named one of the Blooloop 50 list of theme park influencers in 2020.

Background and early career

Sotto was born in Hollywood, California. His aunt, Marilyn Sotto, was a costume illustrator and designer who worked for Paramount Pictures, Universal Studios and Walt Disney Productions, and his grandfather Edward Sotto was a scenic artist at Metro-Goldwyn-Mayer and a portrait artist.

Sotto grew up fascinated by Disneyland and as a teenager built a 1/200 scale model of the park based on plans obtained from WED Enterprises. At 21, he acted upon a suggestion to pursue his interests in modelmaking and storyboarding, and was hired as an Assistant Project Director at Knott's Berry Farm. There, he designed Wacky Soap Box Racers, a redesign of the park's Steeplechase-style roller coaster, Motorcycle Chase, and contributed to elements of Camp Snoopy.

In 1983, Sotto became a Show Designer for Hollywood-based Landmark Entertainment Group. During his tenure, he designed and developed themed attractions for Universal Studios Hollywood and Six Flags as well as designs for Mattel.

Walt Disney Imagineering

Sotto's work on the "Laboratory of Scientific Wonders" for a Six Flags project in Baltimore, Maryland, caught the attention of Tony Baxter, Vice President of Design at Walt Disney Imagineering (WDI), who hired Sotto as Show Producer/Designer for Main Street, U.S.A. at Euro Disneyland. Sotto's Disney mentors included veteran Imagineers Herbert Ryman and John Hench.

Sotto spent thirteen years with WDI, eventually being named Senior Vice President of Concept Design in 1994. He was involved in early development of the Indiana Jones Adventure attraction for Disneyland, and directed the master planning of Tokyo Disneyland for three years. His proposal to include a hotel at the entrance of Euro Disneyland led to the first instance of guest accommodations being incorporated into a Disney theme park.

As head of the Concept Development Studio "think tank", Sotto applied principles of Imagineering outside the theme park setting. This culminated in such projects as the "Media as Architecture" facade of ABC's Times Square Studios in New York City and the design of the futuristic Encounter Restaurant in Los Angeles International Airport's Theme Building. Other innovative projects the Concept Development Studio developed included smart wireless toys, augmented reality coasters, online worlds, and resort concepts.

Other projects included the Mission: SPACE attraction at Epcot and the $90m Pooh's Hunny Hunt ride at Tokyo Disneyland.

After Disney

Sotto left Disney in 1999 to become Executive Vice President of Creative Affairs for the Digital Entertainment Network. Established to create "original youth culture programming and e-commerce opportunities ... for Generation Y consumers", DEN clients included Ford, Dell, Blockbuster, and Pepsi.

In 2000, Sotto became Chief Creative Officer of Progress City. Seeking to explore the convergence of the Internet, architecture, and wireless devices, Progress City was founded to develop leading edge technology solutions for clients such as BBDO, Kodak, Motorola, Dentsu, San Diego Padres, NASA, and The Walt Disney Company.

SottoStudios Inc.

Founded in 2004, SottoStudios' mandate is stated as "seeing the impossible as a beautiful puzzle, and then bringing in the right combination of people to crack the code". The studio specializes in highly themed or exotic design projects, including select private residences, and uses the tools of theme park design to help develop products, brands and businesses. Clients have included Aston-Martin, Ferrari, Porsche, Embraer, Disney, Knott’s, Blue Origin, Paramount Pictures, NBC/Universal, Irvine Co., Kerzner, and Wynn Resorts.

Through his company, Sotto developed television series for VH1 networks, ABC, Showtime and CNN, and created a news format utilizing the Google search engine for Current TV. He continues to provide creative consulting and design development services to Walt Disney Imagineering.

SottoStudios has applied the theory of "experiential design" to the Las Vegas Penske-Wynn Ferrari-Maserati dealership, and a James Bond-inspired Aston Martin showroom for Los Angeles' Galpin Aston Martin dealership. Sotto also developed a unique showroom and museum gallery for Galpin Porsche in Santa Clarita, California. The studio also developed designs for a McLaren showroom. One of Sotto's collaborations with Embraer, the SkyRanch One, was named Best Private Jet Concept at the 2017 Yacht and Aviation Awards. Other Sotto-Embraer partnerships include the Skyacht One and Manhattan Airship. SottoStudios is also a consultant for Virgin Galactic.

Other projects have included building a film history-themed pop-up store for Turner Classic Movies and partnering with chef John Sedlar to create Los Angeles' Rivera Restaurant. For Rivera, Sotto named and created the restaurant's identity, along with  architectural and thematic design elements. He was also a general partner in the restaurant. SottoStudios was also involved in assisting scientist Danny Hillis in the design of his 10,000-year clock for the Long Now Foundation.

Futureproof Experiences

In 2020, Sotto created the think tank Futureproof Experiences in response to the COVID-19 pandemic and its effect on the themed entertainment industry. The group seeks to incorporate talents from the creative, business, and health care industries to create frictionless and compelling entertainment experiences which combine security and pandemic precautions.

Partial List of Projects at Walt Disney Imagineering

Projects in Sotto’s portfolio of design responsibility included:

Disneyland

 Master Planning Attraction Proposals
 Indiana Jones Adventure: Temple of the Forbidden Eye Concept Design
 Adventureland Renovation
 Main Street, U.S.A. Renovation
 Storybook Land Canal Boats Enhancements
 Aladdin's Oasis
 Fantasmic! Esplanade
 Main Street, USA Audio Enhancements
 Space Mountain Onboard Audio Enhancements

Walt Disney World

 Space Mountain FedEx Enhancements
 Mission: SPACE Conceptual Design
 World Showcase Proposals
 Pal Mickey Interactive Toy
 Videopolis Dance Club

Tokyo Disneyland

 Sci-Fi City and New Fantasyland Master Planning
 Disney Resort Line Monorail Station
 Pooh's Hunny Hunt
 Queen of Hearts Banquet Hall
 Alice's Tea Party
 The Enchanted Tiki Room – Get the Fever!
 World Bazaar Interior Designs

Disneyland Paris

 Executive Designer/Show Producer, Main Street, U.S.A.
 Disneyland Railroad Steam Trains
 Disneyland Hotel Concept Design

Concept Development Studio

 ABC Times Square Studios, New York City
 Encounter Restaurant at Los Angeles International Airport
 Interactive Ride Technologies
 Online Worlds

Voice Over Work

 Main Street Upstairs Windows (Disneyland Paris/Disneyland)
 Space Mountain (Walt Disney World/Disneyland)
 Market House Telephone (Disneyland/Walt Disney World/Disneyland Paris)
 Radio Toontown (Disneyland)
 Shrunken Ned (Disneyland)
 Aladdin’s Other Lamp (Disneyland)
 Disneyland/Walt Disney World Railroad boarding call (Disneyland Paris/Walt Disney World)
 Big Thunder Mountain (Disneyland Paris)

Actor

Star Tours concourse introductory video, original version (Disneyland)

References

External links
 SottoStudios Official Site
 Futureproof Experiences
 Wacky Soap Box Racers
 The How of Wow! | Eddie Sotto | TEDxBermuda
 Open Discussion Thread with Sotto at WDWMagic.com Part I Part II

Disney imagineers
Living people
1958 births